Billy's Holiday is a 1995 Australian musical film.

Production
Screenwriter Denis Whitburn had written a play called The Siege of Frank Sinatra in which Max Cullen had starred in its original 1980 production. During the production Cullen and Whitburn would head out to bars and Cullen would sing in a Billie Holiday voice. In the early 1990s Whitburn decided to write a film about this ability and wrote the script in three weeks.

The opening scene has James Morrison playing "I Can't Get Started" à la Bunny Berigan.

References

External links

Billy's Holiday at Oz Movies

1995 films
1990s musical films
Australian musical films
Cultural depictions of Billie Holiday
1990s English-language films
1990s Australian films